Ella  Mitchell (born 15 August 1937) is an American soul singer and actress. Mitchell is best remembered for playing the comic role as Hattie Mae Pierce (Big Momma) in the 2000 comedy film Big Momma's House and Evillene the evil witch in the Broadway theatre revival production of the musical The Wiz.

Career
Mitchell appeared in the 1975 film Lord Shango.

Mitchell assumed the role of Evillene when The Wiz revived on Broadway in 1984.  She reprised the role again when the show was on tour in 1992.

Mitchell was a member of The Gospel All Stars and The Bradford Singers, and performed with the Alvin Ailey American Dance Theater for 30 years.

Filmography

References

External links

The Wiz

1937 births
Place of birth missing (living people)
Living people
African-American actresses
American film actresses
American women singers
20th-century African-American women singers
21st-century African-American people
21st-century African-American women